Te Rangatira W. Waitokia (born 11 April 1996) is a New Zealand rugby union player who currently plays for Rugby ATL of Major League Rugby (MLR) and  in the Bunnings NPC. His position is wing or Fullback.

Career
Waitokia signed for Major League Rugby side Rugby ATL ahead of the 2021 Major League Rugby season. He returned to New Zealand as a replacement player for  during the 2022 Bunnings NPC.

References

External links
itsrugby.co.uk Profile

1996 births
Living people
New Zealand rugby union players
Rugby union wings
Rugby union fullbacks
Manawatu rugby union players
Rugby ATL players
Tasman rugby union players